Prince Gyasi Nyantakyi (born 30 April 1995) also known by the artist name Prince Gyasi is a Ghanaian international visual artist. He is the co-founder of Boxedkids, a non-profit organization helping kids from Accra get an education.

Early life
Gyasi had his secondary education at the Accra Academy senior high school in Accra.

Career
Gyasi started taking pictures in 2011 and bought his first iPhone in 2014 which is the primary tool he uses in creating his art pieces. He began with snapshots of friends, family and models from his hometown of Ghana and then realized he could seriously use his phone as an arts creation tool, as a means of expression.

He using an iPhone to shoot is a way to distinguish his art from other visual artists and photographers to break the codes of this singular and elitist art. His work is all about conveying feelings through colors and giving the floor to the people that are left aside from the society. He indeed considers his use of colors as a source of therapy to his audience. Motherhood, Fatherhood, childhood can be considered as his most characteristic themes.

Exhibition
Prince Gyasi was signed to Nil Gallery Paris in 2018 which gave him the chance to exhibit his art pieces at multiple art fairs in the USA.

He has exhibited in the Seattle Contemporary Art fair, Texas Contemporary Art Fair, Artsy & Context Art Miami and pulse Contemporary Art Fair (Art Basel Miami). Prince has also exhibited some of his works at the Investec Cape Town Art Fair in South Africa.

A Great Day In Accra
In December 2018, he got commissioned by Apple Inc. to work on a project in Ghana titled A Great Day In Accra to push the Hiplife music genre in Ghana to the world. In this project he shot Ghanaian hiplife musicians like Gyedu-Blay Ambolley, Reggie Rockstone, Okyeame Kwame, Rab Bakari, Abrewa Nana, Hammer of The Last Two, Beat Menace, Gurunkz, Joey B, EL (rapper), DJ Breezy, Stargo, Kirani Ayat, Akan (Musician), Kiddblack, Ansah Live, Imani N.A.D, Toyboi, Kwesi Arthur and Shadow.

GQ Summer/Spring Issue 2020
In December 2019, Prince got commissioned by GQ Style to shoot Burna Boy for their Summer/Spring Issue 2020 in Ikoyi, Lagos. The shoot was titled "Global Giant" because of the release of Burna's album "African Giant".

Off-White Collaboration
Prince was featured in Virgil Abloh’s Spring/Summer 2021 collection Off-White brand which premiered in February on Imaginary TV. He performed alongside Virgil Abloh’s new creative cast; Milanese choreographer, Michele Rizzo and Japanese DJ, Kiri Okuyama, all rocking apparel from the brands new line.

Prince also modeled the new Off-White SS21 collection which was featured on Farfetch in March 2021.

Naomi Campbell for Madame Figaro
In 26 March 2021, Prince got commissioned by Madame Figaro France to shoot Naomi Campbell for the cover image of that issue. The shoot was styled by Jenke Ahmed Tailly and was shot in Lagos during Arise Fashion Week.

GQ Magazine October Issue
In September 2021, Prince was commissioned by GQ Magazine to shoot Wizkid for its October issue in Accra, Ghana. Wizkid was crowned “King of Afropop” by GQ Magazine after this shoot which was styled by Karen Binns.

Speaking engagements

2019 Skoll World Forum
Prince Gyasi was invited on 9 April 2019 to give a speech about his creative works during the 2019 Skoll World Forum at the Oxford University in London. During his speech he spoke about the stories behind his work of arts and his influences. He also spoke about his non-profit organization Boxed kids which he co-founded.

Notable mentions
He was mentioned by Vanity Fair as one of the top 9 visual artist to follow in 2018.
Prince Gyasi was part of five black photographers interviewed by Good Morning America to speak about their work and about Vogue's historic cover with Beyoncé.
Prince Gyasi has been featured on the BBC Africa for his exceptional way of making images with his iPhone.
 Prince has also been featured by CNN style as one of the seven leading African photographers from across the continent.
Prince was featured again by CNN on how his work turns to color therapy for a lot of his followers. The article also mentioned how Prince was one of the most sort after artist on the art marketplace Artsy moving from 54th to 2nd place in 2020.
Prince's art pieces offered at fairs on Artsy in 2021 has had the greatest number of collectors inquiring about them than any artist on the platform.

References

External links

Nil Gallery
Official Website
Prince giving a speech at the Skoll Forum

Living people
Alumni of the Accra Academy
1995 births
Ghanaian artists